Besueri Kiwanuka Lusse Mulondo (12 March 1926 – 4 April 2016) was a Ugandan politician and a Senior Presidential Adviser on Land Matters.

References

1926 births
2016 deaths
Ugandan politicians